Hollow log may refer to:

Hollow Log (Balch Park), a hollowed-out tree in California
 Hollow log coffin or memorial pole, an Aboriginal Australian ceremonial burial artefact, now created as artworks

See also
Log Hollow Falls
Rocky Hollow Log Ride